The St. Andrews Evangelical German Lutheran Church near Zeeland, North Dakota, United States, was built in 1893 by Germans from Russia.  Also known as St. Andrews Lutheran Parish District, the historic area was listed on the National Register of Historic Places in 1990.  The listing included four contributing buildings and one contributing site.

The district includes the original 1893 church, a 1906 church, a parsonage, and a cemetery.

One work includes Colonial Revival architecture.

References

Lutheran churches in North Dakota
Colonial Revival architecture in North Dakota
German-Russian culture in North Dakota
Churches on the National Register of Historic Places in North Dakota
Churches completed in 1893
Historic districts on the National Register of Historic Places in North Dakota
National Register of Historic Places in McIntosh County, North Dakota
1893 establishments in North Dakota